The Bellows Falls Neighborhood Historic District encompasses a residential area of the village of Bellows Falls, Vermont.  Located south of downtown Bellows Falls, the area has one of the largest concentrations of well-preserved 19th century residences in southern Vermont.  It was listed on the National Register of Historic Places in 2002, and enlarged in 2007.

Description and history
Bellows Falls is an incorporated village within the municipality of Rockingham in southeastern Vermont.  It is located on the west bank of Connecticut River, and was the site at which that river was first bridged, in 1785.  As a consequence, the village has since then been a transportation hub, as a nexus of water, road, and railroad routes formed there over the course of the 19th century.  Industrial development grew in part due to the Bellows Falls Canal, which provided water power to a variety of industries.  The village downtown grew immediately west of the canal and the primary industrial area, and its residential neighborhoods grew west and south of the downtown.

The residential historic district, when first designated in 2002, was a roughly  bounded on the north by School Street, the east by Westminster Street, and the west by Atkinson Street (United States Route 5), extending a short way west of Atkinson on Burt Street and Hapgood Place.

This neighborhood area contains one of the best concentrations of pre-World War II residential architecture in southern Vermont.  Most of the housing in this area is wood-frame construction, buildings typically containing one to three units.  Most of the housing stock was built between about 1850 and 1920, when the village was economically at its peak, and represent a cross section of architectural styles of that period.  The oldest buildings in the area date to the late 18th century.  Institutional buildings include two schools, two churches, two fraternal meeting houses, a library, and a funeral home.  More than 90% of the buildings in the district were built before 1950, a remarkably high concentration for districts of this size.

See also
National Register of Historic Places listings in Windham County, Vermont

References

Historic districts on the National Register of Historic Places in Vermont
Federal architecture in Vermont
Greek Revival architecture in Vermont
Bellows Falls, Vermont
National Register of Historic Places in Windham County, Vermont
Historic districts in Windham County, Vermont